is a former Japanese football player.

Playing career
Nagayama was born in Kanagawa Prefecture on 16 September 1970. He joined Nissan Motors (later Yokohama Marinos) from youth team in 1989. He played many matches as right side midfielder and right side back from first season and the club won the champions in all three major title in Japan; Japan Soccer League, JSL Cup and Emperor's Cup. In early 1999s, the club won 1990 JSL Cup, 1991 and 1992 Emperor's Cup. In Asia, the club also won the champions 1991–92 and 1992–93 Asian Cup Winners' Cup. In late 1990s, although the club won the champions 1995 J1 League, he got hurt and could not play at all in the match in 1995 and 1998. In 2000s, he played many matches and the club won the champions 2001 J.League Cup. In 2003, although his opportunity to play decreased, the club won the champions 2003 J1 League. He retired end of 2003 season.

Club statistics

References

External links

1970 births
Living people
Association football people from Kanagawa Prefecture
Japanese footballers
Japan Soccer League players
J1 League players
Yokohama F. Marinos players
Association football midfielders